The Fédération du Scoutisme Français (Federation of French Scouting) is an umbrella organization that combines the efforts of the several Scouting and Guiding associations in France and also represents the Scouting movement in French Guiana, Martinique, Saint-Pierre and Miquelon, New Caledonia, Réunion, Wallis and Futuna and Guadeloupe. Until 2012 the Muslim Scouts of France were presiding the Federation with Dr. Younès F. Aberkane as president.

The federation serves about 134,000 members (as of 2008) and is a member of both the World Association of Girl Guides and Girl Scouts and the World Organization of the Scout Movement.

Member organizations

 Éclaireuses et Éclaireurs de France (EEdF) – for persons of any religion, oldest Scouting organization in the country, formed in 1911
 Éclaireuses et Éclaireurs israélites de France (EEIdF) – for Jewish Scouts, formed in 1923
 Éclaireuses et Éclaireurs unionistes de France (EEUdF) – for Protestant Scouts, formed in 1911
 Scouts et Guides de France (SGdF) – formed on September 1, 2004 from the merger of two Roman Catholic Scouting organizations: the Guides de France (founded in 1923) and the Scouts de France (founded in 1920)
 Scouts Musulmans de France (SMdF) – for Muslim Scouts, formed in 1990
 Éclaireurs de la Nature (EDLN) – for Buddhist Scouts; full member 2017
 Scouts Vietnamiens de France (ASVD) – for youth of Vietnamese descent; associate member

Non-sovereign territories with Scouting run by Scoutisme Français include

French Guiana – Scouting in French Guiana
Guadeloupe and Saint Martin – Scouting in Guadeloupe et Saint Martin
Martinique – Scouts et Guides de Martinique
Mayotte – Scouting in Mayotte
New Caledonia – Scouting in New Caledonia
Réunion – Scouting on Réunion
Saint Pierre and Miquelon
Wallis and Futuna – Scouting in Wallis and Futuna

See also
Pierre Joubert
Scouting in France

References

External links
Official Website 
World Scout Jamboree of 1947 in Moisson, France 

Scouting and Guiding in France
World Association of Girl Guides and Girl Scouts member organizations
World Organization of the Scout Movement member organizations
Youth organizations established in 1940
1940 establishments in France